Michaelshaffera maidoa is a species of snout moth in the genus Michaelshaffera. It was described by Schaus in 1922. It is found in French Guiana.

References

Moths described in 1922
Chrysauginae